Nesaecrepida is a genus of flea beetles in the family Chrysomelidae. There are 2 described species in Nesaecrepida, found in North America, Mexico, and the West Indies.

Species
 Nesaecrepida asphaltina (Suffrian, 1868)
 Nesaecrepida infuscata (Schaeffer, 1906)

References

Further reading

External links

 

Alticini
Chrysomelidae genera
Articles created by Qbugbot
Taxa named by Doris Holmes Blake